Parnell is an unincorporated community in DeWitt County, Illinois, United States.

Parnell has a grain handling facility, owned by Tate & Lyle, with a rail hub and truck depot.

References

Unincorporated communities in DeWitt County, Illinois
Unincorporated communities in Illinois